Third Power was an American psychedelic hard rock band from Detroit, Michigan, who released one album in 1970.

The group was formed in 1969, and became a prominent local club band before signing to Vanguard Records. Guitarist Drew Abbott and bassist Jem Targal shared singing duties. They released an album, Believe, on the label in 1970. The album made modest sales but the group disbanded in 1971. Abbott later went on to work with Bob Seger, and Targal briefly led his own solo career.  Seger lived next door to Targal in Waterford Village, Michigan and met Abbott there.

Discography
Believe (Vanguard Records, 1970) U.S. #194

Members
Drew Abbott - guitars, backing and lead vocals
Jem Targal - bass, lead vocals
Jim Craig - drums

References

External links
 

1969 establishments in Michigan
1971 disestablishments in Michigan
Hard rock musical groups from Michigan
Psychedelic rock music groups from Michigan
Musical groups from Detroit
Musical groups established in 1969
Musical groups disestablished in 1971